Harvey Gap State Park, is a Colorado state park founded in 1987. It is well known for its fishing and limited use boating. The park's reservoir — Grass Valley Reservoir — is  when full and allows fishing year round.

References

State parks of Colorado
Protected areas of Garfield County, Colorado
Protected areas established in 1987
1987 establishments in Colorado